The 1992–93 Arizona Wildcats men's basketball team represented the University of Arizona as members of the Pacific-10 Conference during the 1992–93 season. The team's head coach was Lute Olson. The team played its home games in McKale Center.

After going 17–1 to win the Pac-10 regular-season title by a 5-game margin, the team was seeded second in the West region of the NCAA tournament.  The Wildcats were upset in the first round by Santa Clara, 64–61, and finished with an overall record of 24–4. It was the second straight NCAA Tournament where the Wildcats were bounced in the opening round by a double-digit seed.

Roster

Schedule and results

|-
!colspan=9 style=| Regular Season

|-
!colspan=9 style=| NCAA Tournament

NCAA basketball tournament
West
Arizona (#2 seed) 61, Santa Clara (#15 Seed) 64

Rankings

Team players drafted into the NBA

References

Arizona
Arizona Wildcats men's basketball seasons
Arizona
Arizona Wildcats
Arizona Wildcats